National Paper Airplane Day is an unofficial observance, celebrated on May 26 each year in the United States to commemorate the simple aeronautical toy.

Paper airplane day celebrations typically include social gatherings at which participants create and fly paper airplanes. These events often feature contests in two basic flight categories: "distance" and "time in air". , Takuo Toda holds the world record for the longest time in air (27.9 seconds).  The distance record (226 feet, 10 inches or 69.14 meters) was set by Joe Ayoob, with a plane constructed by John Collins, in February 2012.

References

External links
Ken Jennings on National Paper Airplane Day
National Paper Airplane Day Facebook page

Unofficial observances
Paper planes
May observances